SS Rosalind was a passenger and cargo carrying ship that was operated by the Red Cross Line between New York and St John's, sailing along the northeast coast of North America, in the early part of the twentieth century. Originally named Tosari when she was launched in 1890, she was renamed Admiral after a year when she was bought by Deutsche Ost-Afrika Linie. She joined the Red Cross Line in 1902 and worked the route for twelve years, with a short break in 1912 working in Australia when she was renamed City of Sydney, finally colliding with Shag Rock off the coast of Nova Scotia and sinking on 17 March 1914. She is known as the ship after which Rosalind Russell is named.

Design
Rosalind was a steamship built of steel, constructed by Swan Hunter & Wigham Richardson of Wallsend on the River Tyne. The vessel was assessed at 2568 Gross register tonnage and 1634 net register tonnage.

Career
Launched on 30 October 1890, the ship was first named Tosari after the village in Java and joined the fleet of Dampfschiffs Rhederei zu Hamburg. However, within a year the company sold the vessel to Deutsche Ost-Afrika Linie who renamed her Admiral.

Between 1902 and 1912, the ship was operated by Bowring Brothers on the Red Cross Line. The line had a tradition of naming their ships after characters from Shakespeare's plays, and so renamed Admiral after Rosalind in As You Like It. The ship provided a premium service for passengers to travel between St. John's and New York via Halifax. The service was a popular attraction for the views that passengers saw on the journey as much as its destinations. It was while travelling on this service that James and Clara Russell decided to name their daughter after the ship; Rosalind Russell continued to treasure a picture of the ship during her film career.

In 1912, Rosalind was sold to the St Lawrence Shipping Company and renamed City of Sydney. Unfortunately, she was involved in a collision with the tug Douglas H Thomas in Sydney Harbour which killed five people. Soon afterwards, she resumed work with the Red Cross Line and was back in the coastal waters of the Western Atlantic Ocean.

Loss
On 17 March 1914, the vessel was sailing from New York to Halifax carrying eleven passengers and a cargo of coal. Due to fog, as she approached her destination, she struck Shag Island near Sambro, Nova Scotia and, although everyone on board and much of the cargo was saved, the ship itself was lost.

Legacy
The ship was not the only Rosalind operated by Bowring. The company operated two more vessels named Rosalind, one from 1913 to 1917 and another 1919 to 1928.

References

1890 ships
Maritime incidents in March 1914
Ships built on the River Tyne
Steamships of the United Kingdom
Victorian-era merchant ships of the United Kingdom